The M1935 (Mle 1935) is a French heavy anti-tank mine. It consists of a large heavy steel base plate with a hinged thin steel lid. Inside the lid it has a rectangular steel container, which holds the explosive charge. The mines are laid at a minimum interval of six feet.

A pressure of eight hundred pounds crushes the lid onto the pressure fuse, triggering the mines main charge. The mine uses either the M1935 or M1936 pressure fuse.

References

 Landmine and Countermine Warfare, North Africa, 1940-1943

Anti-tank mines
Land mines of France